Romeo Gonzales Arcilla (born June 24 1966), professionally known as John Arcilla, is a Filipino actor and environmentalist.
Arcilla won the Best Actor Award at the 78th Venice International Film Festival for his performance in On the Job: The Missing 8. He is the first Filipino and Southeast Asian to win the Volpi Cup for Best Actor. He played the role of Antonio Luna in the historical drama film Heneral Luna that made him a renowned Historical Film Icon in Philippine Cinema. Arcilla also played as Hagorn in the fantasy drama series Encantadia. He is also famous for playing the role of Renato Hipolito in the longest action drama in Philippine television series FPJ's Ang Probinsyano. Arcilla received a Best Actor Award from the prestigious Gawad Urian in 2022 for the film On The Job: The Missing 8. He also won the Movie Actor of the Year from the 37th PMPC Star Awards for Movies for the film Suarez: The Healing Priest.

Personal life 
John Arcilla was born in Quezon City, Philippines to Filipino parents, Dominador Gil Alemania Arcilla and Eustaquia Gonzales. Arcilla and his family moved to his mother's hometown in Baler, Aurora due to the declaration of martial law in 1972. Arcilla began to show interest in acting at age 7.

Education 
Arcilla finished high school at Mount Carmel College of Baler (MCC Baler).He was a member of the community based Philippine Educational Theater Association-Metropolitan Teen Theater League (PETA-MTTL) during his high school days. He graduated as a scholar of mass communication from Saint Joseph's College of Quezon City (SJCQC). He was an acting scholar of the Actors Workshop Foundation under Laurice Guillen, Johnny Delgado, and Leo Martinez from 1987 to 1990.

Career 
Arcilla joined Dulaang UP (1988–1989) through the stage director and National Artist for Theater Tony Mabesa. In 1989–1990, Arcilla was a casting director for Foote, Cone & Belding. In 1990–1991, Arcilla became one of the pioneer members of the Actors Company of the Cultural Center of the Philippines via the Tanghalang Pilipino from 1991–1997. The Tanghalang Pilipino is the resident theater company of the Cultural Center of the Philippines (CCP). He played the lead roles in several plays, including Orosman and Zafira, Walang Sugat, and Ryan Cayabyab's Rizal musical trilogy: El Filibusterismo (1993), Noli Me Tángere (1995), and Illustrado (1996).

Arcilla was also part of the main cast of Rama at Sita (1999), a full-length Filipino musical adapted from the Indian epic Ramayana. Sari Kultur is the production outfit that produced Rama at Sita.  In 2000, Arcilla became a guest actor for Repertory Philippines and was one of the main cast in Kiss of the Spider Woman. He played the role of Valentin Arregui Paz, a middle-class socialist revolutionary imprisoned for his political activism.

Aside from performing onstage, Arcilla has been endorsing products for TV commercials of brands such as Tide and Gold Eagle and companies like National Steel Corporation and Development Bank of the Philippines (DBP) since 1987–1988. Arcilla became prominent through the TV Ad of the 1990s Purefoods Honecured Bacon with the iconic line, “Coffee na lang, Dear”  and paved the way for Arcilla to receive more mainstream projects..

Arcilla has appeared as a main, supporting/recurring, or guest cast in various TV shows and dramas on major Philippine TV networks. Arcilla's TV stint started in 1987 as a gag artist in Goin Bananas (ABS-CBN). He also often appeared as an episode cast in the Wakasan Series (RPN 9) and Lovingly Yours, Helen (GMA 7). In the early days of his TV career, Arcilla mostly played the role of a father to teenage stars appearing in TV series (ABS-CBN and GMA).

Arcilla often guests in ABS-CBN’s Star Drama Theater Presents, a weeknight TV anthology. On this TV program, Arcilla usually played the onscreen partner to the biggest female stars in the 1990s.

For Arcilla’s early film appearances, he had a cameo role as one of the photojournalists covering the release of political detainees in Lino Brocka’s Orapronobis (Fight for Us, 1989). Arcilla had a bigger role in Raymond Red’s first full-length feature, Bayani (Heroes, 1992). Arcilla played General Mariano Noriel, who was a member of the War Council that oversaw Andres Bonifacio's case in 1897.

For Sakay (1993), Arcilla played General Leon Villafuerte, the revolutionary chief of staff in Macario Sakay's Tagalog Republic. Arcilla’s film break was in Sa 'Yo Lamang (1995), where he played Hector, the loving elder brother of Andrew (Richard Gomez). In 1996, Arcilla played Lino, a helpful boatman yet stonehearted husband in the film Mulanay, for which he won Best Actor at the 1996 Manila Film Festival. A year later, he starred in Ligaya ang Itawag Mo sa Akin and won a Best Supporting Actor Award at the Gawad Urian.

From 1998–2005, Arcilla starred in several supporting roles in film and television, including the 2000 drama series, Pangako sa 'Yo, the 2003 action-crime drama, Basta't Kasama Kita, and 2005 fantasy drama, Sugo. He played the lead role in the film adaptation of Tony Perez' play about infidelity, Sa North Diversion Road. Arcilla and co-star Irma Adlawan have previously played their roles in the theater version. Both actors were nominated at the 2006 Golden Screen Award for Best Performance by an Actor and Actress in a Leading Role (Drama) respectively.

In 2006, Arcilla starred in the film Compound. He was once again nominated for a Best Performance by an Actor in a Leading Role (Drama) at the 2007 Golden Screen Award and earned a nomination for Movie Actor of the Year at the Star Awards for Movies. After that, Arcilla appeared in the following films: A Love Story (2007), Ay Ayeng (2008), and Villa Estrella (2008). In 2009, he earned his third Gawad Urian nomination for Best Supporting Actor for the film Manila Skies.

He starred in three films in 2010, the indie film Halaw where he won a Best Actor Award at the Cinemalaya Philippine Independent Film Festival, Amigo, which is an American-Filipino drama film based on the Philippine–American War, and the comedy-drama, Petrang Kabayo. He returned to television in 2010 in the suspense drama Magkaribal. In 2011, he played supporting characters in two television shows, Machete and Mana Po. He was also in two films, Thelma and No Other Woman.

He had his Hollywood debut for a cameo role in the 2012 spy thriller The Bourne Legacy, where he played the head security guard. He also played Mariano Trias in the Emilio Aguinaldo biopic, El Presidente. Arcilla was also in the cast of Lilet Never Happened, which won the Best Cast Ensemble at the 2013 International Film Festival Manhattan.

In 2013, he starred in the British-Filipino independent film Metro Manila which was selected as the British entry for the Best Foreign Language Film at the 86th Academy Awards. Arcilla earned a Best Supporting Actor nomination at the 16th British Independent Film Awards. Metro Manila won the Audience Award from the 2013 Sundance Film Festival. It also received a nomination for Best Foreign Film at the 2014 British Academy of Film and Television Arts (BAFTA) Awards.

In 2014, Arcilla was part of the cast of Muslim Magnum .357: To Serve and Protect. He was also in episodes of Magpakailanman and Maalala Mo Kaya.

In 2015, Arcilla played Gen. Antonio Luna in the historical biopic film, Heneral Luna. To prepare for the role, he analyzed the positive and negative sides of Antonio Luna's personality, taking note of his temper and vulnerability. The film broke the record for highest grossing Filipino historical film of all time. For his outstanding performance as Antonio Luna, Arcilla won the Best Actor Award at the 34th Film Academy of the Philippines. He also received a Best Actor nomination at the 10th Asian Film Awards. Owing to the popularity of his role as Antonio Luna, Arcilla would later reprise or parody his role as the general in various television commercials.

In 2016, Arcilla was part of the cast of Mikhail Red's Birdshot, where he played the senior police officer Mendoza, assigned to train his rookie partner for handling an investigation. For his role, Arcilla won the Best Supporting Actor Award at the 2018 Film Academy of the Philippines. Birdshot was the entry of the Philippines for Best Foreign Language Film at the 90th Academy Awards. He also starred in the short film Supot, directed by Phil Giordano and shot in the Philippines. Arcilla won the Craft Award for Best Supporting Actor at the 2017 First Run Festival, New York. Supot had its world premiere at the 21st Busan International Film Festival. It also won Best Screenplay at the 2016 New York Screenplay Contest.

In 2019, Arcilla made two horror movies: Second Coming and Kuwaresma. As Arturo Fajardo (husband of Sharon Cuneta in the film), Arcilla’s brilliant performance as the dominant and strict patriarch with a dark secret, received great feedback from critics. He also starred in the comedy film, The Panti Sisters, where he played Don Emilio, the stern father of three gay sons. Arcilla was nominated as Best Supporting Actor in the 2019 Pista ng Pelikulang Pilipino.

Later that year, Arcilla was also part of the main cast of the Filipino adaptation of the Korean film Miracle in Cell No 7 (2013), where he played the prison warden Johnny San Juan (Jang Min-hwan in Korean and played by Korean actor Jung Jin-young).

From 2017–2022, Arcilla plays Renato "Buwitre" Hipolito a power-hungry and corrupt government official, who is the main antagonist and arch-nemesis of Cardo Dalisay (Coco Martin) in FPJ's Ang Probinsyano.

In 2020, Arcilla played the lead role as Fernando Suarez in the biographical film, Suarez: The Healing Priest. Arcilla received a nomination as Best Actor in a Leading Role for the 2020 Metro Manila Film Festival (MMFF) and won the Best Actor of the Year at the 37th PMPC Star Awards for Movies.

In 2021, John Arcilla starred in Erik Matti's On the Job: The Missing 8. For his role as the local journalist Narciso "Sisoy" Salas, a loyal ally to a politician who turned out to be a corrupt public official, Arcilla won the Volpi Cup for Best Actor. On the Job: The Missing 8 premiered at the 78th Venice Film Festival. Later, the film was made into a six-part series and aired as an HBO Asia Original Series.

He also appeared in two other films in 2021, Big Night! and A Hard Day. A Hard Day is a Filipino adaptation of the 2014 Korean action-thriller film of the same title, where Arcilla played as Lieutenant Ace “Alas” Franco (Lt. Park Chang-min in Korean and played by Korean actor Cho Jin-woong).

Big Night! is a dark comedy that tackles the “war on drugs” in the Philippines. Big Night! and A Hard Day were both entries at the 2021 Metro Manila Film Festival where Arcilla earned a nomination for Best Supporting Actor. With his role as the retired action star, Donato Rapido, involved in drug deals, Arcilla won the Best Supporting Actor for Big Night!.  He received a Best Supporting Actor Award for A Hard Day from the 24th Gawad Pasado in 2022.

In 2022, Arcilla starred in the suspense thriller film Reroute. Arcilla was also in a romantic comedy, How to Move on in 30 Days, a TV series streamed via the YouTube Channel of ABS-CBN Entertainment. Arcilla's latest teleserye is ABS-CBN's Dirty Linen (2023), where he plays as one of the lead actors, Carlos Fiero. Arcilla also stars in Jun Lana’s Ten Little Mistresses, a murder mystery-cum-comedy.

Filmography

Television

Film

Awards and nominations 
Arcilla has earned numerous acting awards and nominations from various award-giving bodies in the Philippines and abroad. In 2013, Arcilla received his first international acting nomination as Best Supporting Actor at the 16th British Independent Film Awards for the film Metro Manila. In 2016, he earned a Best Actor nomination at the 10th Asian Film Awards for the film Heneral Luna.

In 2017, Arcilla received his first international Best Supporting Actor Craft Award from the First Run Festival held in New York for the short film Supot. In 2021, Arcilla earned the Volpi Cup for Best Actor from the 78th Venice Film Festival for the film On the Job: The Missing 8. Like the Academy Awards (also known as the Oscars), the Volpi Cup is a highly prestigious international acting award.

Some of his notable films were featured in esteemed international film festivals. It also received prestigious film awards. The film Mulanay was featured at the 1999 Southeast Asian Film Festival. Meanwhile, Ligaya Ang Itawag Mo sa Akin was featured at the 1997 Toronto International Film Festival. Arcilla received a Best Supporting Actor Award for this film in 1997 from Gawad Urian. Raymond Red’s short film Anino won the Palme D'Or for Best Short Film at the 2000 Cannes Film Festival.  When director Jerrold Tarog saw Arcilla's performance as the devil's advocate in Anino, and in the feature film Metro Manila (2013), it made a lasting impression, so he cast Arcilla as General Luna in his film.

Himpapawid (Manila Skies) received a nomination for the Tokyo Grand Prix at the 2009 Tokyo International Film Festival. Halaw (Ways of the Sea) won the Network for the Promotion of Asian Cinema (NETPAC) Special Mention Award at the 2011 Berlin International Film Festival. The NETPAC Special Mention Award is a first for a Filipino film. Amigo was screened at the 2010 Toronto International Film Festival. It was also featured at the 2011 Asian American International Film Festival in New York. Lilet Never Happened earned the Best Cast Ensemble at the 2013 International Film Festival Manhattan.

Metro Manila won the Audience Award: World Dramatic from the 2013 Sundance Film Festival. It received a Nomination for Best Film Not in the English Language at the 67th British Academy Film Awards. Metro Manila also earned a Nomination for Best Foreign Film at the 2014 British Academy of Film and Television Arts (BAFTA) Awards.

Pamanhikan earned several international citations. This short film won the Programmer's Award at the 2016 DisOrient Asian American Film Festival held in Oregon. It received the Audience Choice Award at the 2016 Ithaca Pan Asian American Film Festival. Pamanhikan also won the Best Screenplay at the 2013 Vail Film Festival.

Mikhail Red’s Birdshot won the Best Film Award in the Asian Future Category at the 2016 Tokyo International Film Festival. The short film Supot had its world premiere at the 21st Busan International Film Festival. This short film won Best Screenplay at the 2016 New York Screenplay Contest. It also earned the Best Cinematography at the 2017 First Run Festival held in New York. The film Big Night! (2021), won the Best Film Award at the 19th Asian Film Festival.

Receiving several recognitions as a stellar actor, Arcilla has been a pride of his hometown and received the Dangal ng Aurora in 2005 for his exceptional talent as one of the country's acclaimed actors in theater, film, and television. In 2009, he also received an Outstanding Citizen Award from the municipality of San Luis, Aurora for his exemplary achievements in the field of performing arts.

For performance in film and television

Other awards and recognitions

References

External links 

John Arcilla Awards

1966 births
Living people
ABS-CBN personalities
Filipino male comedians
Filipino male film actors
Filipino male stage actors
GMA Network personalities
Male actors from Metro Manila
People from Aurora (province)
People from Quezon City
That's Entertainment (Philippine TV series)
That's Entertainment Thursday Group Members
Volpi Cup for Best Actor winners